The U.S. Post Office at 201 South First Street in Gallup, New Mexico was built in 1933. It was listed on the National Register of Historic Places in 1988.

The structure was designed as a combination of the Mediterranean and Spanish Pueblo Revival architectural styles.

References

External links

Post office buildings in New Mexico
National Register of Historic Places in McKinley County, New Mexico
Pueblo Revival architecture in New Mexico
Mediterranean Revival architecture in New Mexico
Government buildings completed in 1933